Vaporific effect is a flash fire resulting from the impact of high velocity projectiles with metallic objects. Impacts produce particulate matter originating from either the projectile, the target, or both. Particles heated from the force of impact can burn in the presence of air (oxidizer). An explosion can result from the mixture of metal-dust and air, the resulting dust explosion causing significant overpressure within metallic enclosures (aircraft, vehicles, metallic enclosures, etc.). The vaporific effect is particularly pronounced when these enclosures are constructed of pyrophoric metals (metals that react upon contact with air, such as aluminium, magnesium, or their alloys). Depleted uranium is a pyrophoric material used in kinetic penetrator ammunition.

References

Types of fire
Ballistics